Gaai Aur Gori is a 1973 Indian Hindi-language film directed by M. A. Thirumugam. It is a remake of the Tamil film Komatha En Kulamatha.

Plot 
The film shows the stories of a girl named Gauri who has a pet cow, and how she faces the turmoils of her life.

Cast 
Shatrughan Sinha as Arun
Jaya Bachchan as Vijaya
Bindu as Mohini
Sulochana Latkar as Arun's Mother
Manmohan as Mohini's Brother

Music 
Laxmikant–Pyarelal have composed the music and lyrics by Anand Bakshi.

References

External links 
 

1973 films
1970s Hindi-language films
Films scored by Laxmikant–Pyarelal
Hindi remakes of Tamil films
Films directed by M. A. Thirumugam
Films about cattle